Paul Ben-Haim (or Paul Ben-Chaim, Hebrew: פאול בן חיים) (5 July 1897 – 14 January 1984) was an Israeli composer. Born Paul Frankenburger in Munich, Germany, he studied composition with Friedrich Klose and he was assistant conductor to Bruno Walter and Hans Knappertsbusch from 1920 to 1924. He served as conductor at Augsburg from 1924 to 1931, and afterwards devoted himself to teaching and composition, including teaching at the Shulamit Conservatory in Tel Aviv, Israel.  

Ben-Haim emigrated to the then British Mandate of Palestine in 1933 and lived in Tel Aviv, near Zina Dizengoff Square. He Hebraized his name, becoming an Israeli citizen upon that nation's independence in 1948. He composed chamber music, works for choir, orchestra and solo instruments, and songs. He championed a specifically Jewish national music: his own compositions are in a late Romantic vein with Middle Eastern overtones, somewhat similar to Ernest Bloch.

His students include Eliahu Inbal, Henri Lazarof, Ben-Zion Orgad, Ami Maayani, Shulamit Ran, Miriam Shatal, Rami Bar-Niv and Noam Sheriff. [] Ben-Haim won the Israel Prize for music in 1957.

The archive of Ben-Haim is preserved in the National Library of Israel.

Works, editions and recordings
Selected recordings:
 Cello Concerto (1962), Raphael Wallfisch (cello), BBC National Orchestra of Wales/Łukasz Borowicz. CPO.
 Clarinet Quintet, Two Landscapes, Canzonetta, Improvisation and Dance, Piano Quartet. ARC Ensemble. Chandos
 Concerto for Strings, Pastoral Variée for clarinet, harp and string orchestra Op 31b (1945 arr. 1962), Three Songs without Words (1952), Music for Strings (1955/56). Talia Or (soprano), Bettins Aust (clarinet), Christine Steinbrecher (harp), Bayerische Kammerphilharmonie, conductor Gabriel Adorján. AVI-MUSIC 8553497 (2022)
 Kabbalat Shabbat (Welcoming the Sabbath, evening service) Soloists, Orchester Jakobsplatz München, Grossmann NEOS.
 Melodies, Arion ARN 68643. Varda Kotler, Jeff Cohen, Philippe Bary and Alexis Galpérine
 Sacred services from Israel. Marc Lavry, Yehezkel Braun, Paul Ben-Haim Kabbalat Shabbat. Naxos. Milken Archive
 Symphony No. 1 (1940), Fanfare to Israel (1950), Symphonic Metamorphoses on a Bach Chorale (1968). NDR Radiophilharmonie Hannover Israel Yinon. CPO
 Symphony No. 2 (1945), Concerto Grosso (1931). NDR Radiophilharmonie Hannover Israel Yinon. CPO

See also
 List of Israel Prize recipients

References

Further reading 

 Hadassah Guttmann, The Music of Paul Ben-Haim: A Performance Guide London: Scarecrow Press, 1992
 Jehoash Hirshberg, Paul Ben-Haim: His Life and Works, IMI, 1990, Tel Aviv
 Liran Gurkiewicz, Paul Ben-Haim: The Oratorio Joram and the Jewish Identity of a Composer  Min-Ad: Israel Studies in Musicology Online, 11/2 (2013), 

 Paul Ben-Haim's discography
 The American Symphony Orchestra led by Leon Botstein performed the US Premiere of Ben-Haim's Symphony No. 2 (1945) on May 31, 2009 at Avery Fisher Hall, NYC 

1897 births
1984 deaths
20th-century classical composers
20th-century German conductors (music)
20th-century German male musicians
German male conductors (music)
Israeli composers
Israel Prize in music recipients
Jews in Mandatory Palestine
Jewish emigrants from Nazi Germany to Mandatory Palestine
Jewish classical composers
Male classical composers
Musicians from Munich